Where Are You Now? (2008) is a suspense novel by Mary Higgins Clark.

Synopsis
Ten years ago, 21-year-old Charles MacKenzie, Jr. ("Mack") walked out of his apartment without a word and has never been seen again. He does, however, call his mother annually on Mother's Day to assure her of his health and safety, then hangs up, leaving her frantic questions unanswered. Even his father's death in the 9/11 attacks didn't bring him home or break the pattern of his calls. Now, Carolyn MacKenzie has decided the only way to move on with her own life is to find closure and bring an end to the mystery of her brother's disappearance. This year when Mack makes his regular Mother's Day call, she declares her intention to track him down, no matter what. The following day, Monsignor Devon Mackenzie receives a scrap note reading: Uncle Devon, tell Carolyn she must not look for me. Despite the disapproval and angry reactions of loved ones, Carolyn persists in a search that plunges her into a world of unexpected danger and winding questions.

List of characters and reoccurring mentions 

Carolyn MacKenzie — the main character, attorney at law. Mack's Sister. Olivia's daughter.
Charles “Mack” MacKenzie, Jr. — missing brother.
Olivia Mackenzie — mother of Mack and Carolyn, husband: Charles MacKenzie, Sr., deceased in 9/11.
Nicholas DeMarco — Mack's old roommate, gone into the restaurant business.
Judge Paul Huot — Carolyn's former employer, retired.
Lucas Reeves — private investigator hired to find Mack ten years ago. Son of Carolyn 
Monsignor Devon MacKenzie — of the St. Frances de Sales Church, uncle to Carolyn and Mack.
Aaron Klein — successor of Wallace & Madison Investment Bankers. Son to Esther Klein, who killed in alleged mugging of strange circumstances. 
Esther Klein - Mother of Aaron. Killed in suspicious mugging 8 years ago. Was Mac's favorite teacher.
Roy Barrott — detective taking interest in Mack's file.
Gus and Lil Kramer — superintendents of apartments on West End Ave., where Mack used to live.
Derek Olson — owner of apartments on West End Ave., where Mack used to live.
Elliott Wallace — C.E.O. and chairman of Wallace & Madison Investment Bankers, friend to the MacKenzie family and executor of their trusts.
Dr. David Andrews — retired surgeon, children: Gregg and Lisa “Leesey.”
Dr. Gregg Andrews — brother to "Leesey" Andrews, cardiac surgeon.
Larry Ahearn — friend to Dr. Gregg Andrews, Captain of detectives in Manhattan D.A.
Howard Altman — real estate agent and manager of Olson Properties.
Bruce Galbraith — Mack's old roommate, gone into family's real estate business.
Barbara Hanover Galbraith - Was Mac's girlfriend when he disappeared. Now married to Mack's roommate Bruce Galbraith.
Bob Gaylor — detective assigned to “Leesey” Andrew's case.
Jackie Reynolds — Carolyn's oldest and closest friend, psychologist.
Steve Hockney — nephew to Derek Olson.
Emily Valley — disappeared from club called The Scene tens years ago.
Rosemarie Cummings — disappeared seven years ago.
Virginia Trent — disappeared four years ago.
Thurston Carver — criminal defense lawyer to represent Carolyn.
Paul Murphy — Nick DeMarco's lawyer.
Benny Seppini — Nick DeMarco's chauffeur.
Zach Winters — homeless drunk, visits shelter on Mott Street.
Joan Coleman — volunteer kitchen worker at the shelter on Mott Street.
George Rodenburg — Derek Olson's lawyer.
Douglas Twining, Sr. — chairman and C.E.O of Twining Enterprises, multimillion-dollar real estate firm.

2008 American novels
Novels by Mary Higgins Clark
Simon & Schuster books